Frankenburg is German for "Frankish castle" and may refer to:

Places:
 Frankenburg am Hausruck, a market village in the district of Vöcklabruck in Upper Austria
 a hamlet in the municipality of Lilienthal in Lower Saxony, Germany

Castles or castle ruins:
 Frankenburg (Hegau), abandoned castle near Singen (Hohentwiel)-Bohlingen in the county of Konstanz in Baden-Württemberg, Germany
 Frankenburg (Palatinate), ruined castle in the county of Südliche Weinstraße in Rhineland-Palatinate, Germany
 Château du Frankenbourg, ruined castle near Sélestat-Neubois in the Alsatian département of Bas-Rhin, France (German name: Frankenburg).
 Frankenburg (Upper Austria), abandoned castle in the village of Frankenburg am Hausruck in Upper Austria
 Hausmannsturm (Bad Frankenhausen), above Bad Frankenhausen, Thuringia, Germany
 Frankenberg Castle, in Aachen, Germany

People:
Julius Frankenburg
Richard Frankenburg
Hans, Count of Khevenhüller-Frankenburg

See also 

Frankenberg (disambiguation)

German-language surnames